The New Orleans Stars were a minor league baseball team based in New Orleans, Louisiana, United States that played in the independent Negro leagues for one season in 1924.

See also
List of Negro league baseball teams

References

Negro league baseball teams
Baseball teams established in 1924
Defunct minor league baseball teams
Stars
Professional baseball teams in Louisiana
Baseball teams disestablished in 1924
1924 establishments in Louisiana
1924 disestablishments in Louisiana
Defunct baseball teams in Louisiana